Kamboi is a town located in Chanasma taluka, in Patan district, in the modern Indian state of Gujarat. It uses the postcode number of 384230.

History
It was the site of a decisive victory in 1392 over Farhat-ul-Mulk by Zaffar Khan, who later founded the Muzaffarid dynasty.

Etymology
Kamboika is stated to have been evolved from the Pali Kambojaka or Kambojika as follows:

Kambojika == > Kamboyika == > Kamboika since hard palatal j is known to change to soft y in Indo-Aryan languages and further yi == > i.

The change of palatal j to soft y is not unusual. The Shabazgarhi Inscriptions of king Ashoka also write Kamboja as Kamboya where j is replaced with y.)

To give a few more illustrations, the terms SamJogita, SamaJa, Jajman, Jadu, Jogi and GaJni etc. are also found written as SamYokita, SamaYa Yajman Yadu, Yogi and GaYni where also the j has become soft y.

And lastly, the penultimate letter k being sandwiched between two vowels gets eliminated in ancient Indo-Aryan languages following a documented procedure as noted by ancient Prakritic Grammarians. According to third century Prakritic grammarian Acharya Varuchi, the consonants k, g, ch, j, t, d, p etc. falling between two vowel sounds usually get elited.

Hence KamboiKa == > Kamboi

Thus, the 15th-century records refer to this town as Kamboi.

Tourism

Jain tirtha
The Kamboi town has an old Jain tirtha (pilgrim place) at its centre. The moolnayak of this temple is a  white-coloured idol of Bhagawan Manamohan Parshvanath in the Padmasana posture. The idol dates back to King Samprati’s period (224 – 215 BCE). Other idols in the temple have inscriptions dating back to the 16th century.
The temple was renovated in 2003.

There is also an old temple to Siyojmata, a goddess of the town.

Land-locked trade port
Recent archaeological excavations have discovered that even though land-locked now, the Kamboi and Kambay had been once well known sea ports on the western coast of Gujarat. Similarly also, there was a port named Gandhar in Taluka Bhroach (ancient Bharukachcha) contiguous to Narbada.

See also
 Kamboja-Dvaravati Route
 Kambojas
 Kumbhoj

Notes and references

Notes

References
 Hindu Polity, A Constitutional History of India in Hindu Times, Part I & II, 1978, Dr K. P. Jayswal
 
 The Sind, M. C. Lambrick
 Epigraphia Indica, Vol XXIV, pp 45–46
 "Shri Kamboi Teerth"

Jain temples in Gujarat
Cities and towns in Patan district